Elections to Mole Valley Council were held on 6 May 1999. One third of the council was up for election and the council stayed under no overall control.

After the election, the composition of the council was:
Conservative 17
Liberal Democrat 16
Independent 7
Labour 1

Election result

References
1999 Mole Valley election result

1999
1999 English local elections
1990s in Surrey